List of banks in Egypt shows a list format description of the banks currently, or at some recent time, existing within Egypt

Banks Registered with the Central Bank of Egypt 

 National Bank of Egypt
 Banque Misr 
 Banque du Caire
 The United Bank of Egypt
 Housing and Development Bank
 Suez Canal Bank
 Agricultural Bank of Egypt
 Egyptian Arab Land Bank
 Industrial Development Bank of Egypt
 Export Development Bank of Egypt
 Commercial International Bank (CIB)
 Arab African International Bank
 Arab International Bank
 Arab Investment Bank (AIBK)
 Emirates NBD
 Abu Dhabi Islamic Bank (ADIB)
 Abu Dhabi Commercial Bank - Egypt
 First Abu Dhabi Bank (FAB)
 Mashreq Bank
 Al Ahli Bank of Kuwait - Egypt (ABK-Egypt)
 National Bank of Kuwait - Egypt (NBK-Egypt)
 Qatar National Bank Al Ahli (QNB Alahli)
 Bank of Alexandria
 Société Arabe Internationale de Banque (SAIB)
 Credit Agricole Egypt
 Ahli United Bank
 Faisal Islamic Bank of Egypt
 Al Baraka Bank of Egypt
 Egyptian Gulf Bank (EG BANK)
 HSBC Bank Egypt
 Arab Banking Corporation (Bank ABC)
 Arab Bank Plc.
 Attijariwafa Bank Egypt

Banks with special legislation 

National Investment Bank
Nasser Social Bank

Banks that ceased operations in Egypt 
 National Bank of Oman
 Barclays Bank Egypt sold to Attijariwafa Bank.
 Bank of Nova Scotia sold to Arab African International Bank.
 National Société Générale Egypt sold to Qatar National Bank Al Ahli.
 BNP Paribas Egypt sold to Emirates NBD.
 Piraeus Bank Egypt sold to Al Ahli Bank Of Kuwait.
 Crystal Jmaad Global Bank 
 Citibank N.A., Egypt agreed to transfer its retail banking and cards businesses in Egypt to Commercial International Bank.
 Bank Audi Sold to First Abu Dhabi Bank.
 Blom Bank Sold to Arab Banking Corporation (Bank ABC)
 National Bank of Greece (obtained an approval to commence in the processes of ceasing operations in Egypt.)

See also

 List of banks in Africa
 List of banks in the Arab world
 Central Bank of Egypt

References

External links
Website of Central Bank of Egypt
List of banks in Sharm el Sheikh
List of banks in Switzerland

Egypt
Banks
Banks
Egypt